Georgia is the thirty-third-richest (33rd) state in the United States of America, with a median household income of US$46,007 (2011).

Georgia counties ranked by per capita income

Note: Data is from the 2015 United States Census Data and the 2006-2010 American Community Survey 5-Year Estimates.

References

United States locations by per capita income
Economy of Georgia (U.S. state)
Income